State Road 109 (SR 109) is a  state road in Jacksonville, Florida. It is an east–west road that starts at SR 13 and ends at Jacksonville University. SR 109 is known as University Boulevard because the route forms the eastern border of Jacksonville University's campus.

Route description
University Boulevard travels through the western part of Jacksonville's Arlington neighborhood. Mostly lined with businesses, it is a major thoroughfare throughout its course. SR 109 (University Boulevard)'s southern terminus is at an intersection with SR 13 (San Jose Boulevard), one block from the St. Johns River. It heads due east for over  until reaching St. Augustine Road and turning to the northeast. It then passes over a CSX rail line before meeting U.S. Route 1 (US 1; Philips Highway) and traveling under Interstate 95 (I-95). The highway continues on a more northerly course as it reaches US 90 (Beach Boulevard) and SR 228 (Commodore Point Expressway) before an intersection with SR 10 (Atlantic Boulevard), and turns briefly to the west as it splits with SR 109A (Cesery Boulevard), crossing the Arlington River. After a major interchange with SR 115 (Arlington Expressway), it continues north to Jacksonville University.

History
Prior to the development of Jacksonville University, from which the road gets its current name, it was called Love Grove Road, hence Lovegrove Elementary School, on the same road. It was then very different  from its current urban character. In earlier names it was rural, with farms and open spaces. From 2002 to 2005, the City of Jacksonville fought with neighborhood residents and businesses over two proposed intersection flyover projects included in the Better Jacksonville Plan. One proposed project was at SR 109's intersection with Atlantic Blvd/SR 10, while the other was at its intersection with Beach Blvd/US 90. Residents and businesses feared their properties would be consumed due to the space needed for construction, and that the city would cite eminent domain in order to do so. Other residents were concerned that the flyovers would detract from the beauty of the neighborhoods. In 2006, the City of Jacksonville considered alternative solutions to improving traffic congestion at these intersections, including various at-grade improvements: road widening, additional turn lanes, and other related options. Both plans were scrapped in September 2007.

Major intersections

State Road 109A

State Road 109A (SR 109A), also known as Cesery Boulevard, travels nearly exactly the same course a few blocks to the east of SR 109. Its southern terminus is at an intersection with SR 109 just south of the Arlington River crossing. Then, it travels north, intersecting SR 10 (Atlantic Boulevard) before becoming a two-lane street to its northern terminus at Ft. Caroline Road.

References

109
109
109